Supply Technician (Sup Tech) is the Royal New Zealand Army Logistic Regiment trade responsible for providing Supply & Quartermaster support to the New Zealand Army within New Zealand or overseas.

History 
The New Zealand Supply Technician Trade can trace its lineage to 30 October 1840 with the appointment of Henry Tucker as the First Colonial Storekeeper of the Colony of New Zealand.  For the years leading to 1911 the provision of Supply and Quartermaster support to the New Zealand Forces would be provided by a combination of the Civil Branch of the New Zealand Defence Forces, the Defence Stores Department and Regimental Quartermasters appointed from within the ranks of the various New Zealand military units. As the Defence Forces of New Zealand transitioned to the Territorial Army system in the early twentieth century, a more modern and responsive supply and quartermaster system was required to ensure the ongoing care, maintenance and responsibility of military equipment. In November 1911 thirty young men were selected from across the various New Zealand Military Districts and undertook three weeks specialist Quartermaster Training at the Defence Stores Department in Wellington. Undergoing practical and theoretical instruction in the duties of the office of Regimental Quartermaster Sergeant, the course provided instruction on;

 Weapon storage, inspection, maintenance and accounting,
 The storage, inspection and maintenance of leather items such as horse saddlery and harnesses.
 The correct methods of storage, inspection and maintenance of canvas and fabric items such as tents, other camp canvas and fabric camp equipment.
 Instruction on the packing of stores.
 Instruction on ledger-keeping and the maintenance of stores accounting documentation.

Examinations were held with records showing that at least 18 of the 30 candidates passed the exams successfully and were appointed as Regimental Quartermaster Sergeants in the New Zealand Permanent Staff under General Order 112/10.

As the First World War came to a close it was found that the accounting, care, and custody of stores by New Zealand-based units had been unsatisfactory with Regimental Quartermaster Sergeants and their Staff not carrying out their responsibilities in accordance with New Zealand Military Forces Regulations. As an emergency measure Eleven NZAOC Staff Sergeants were seconded to units to act as Quartermaster-Sergeants with units in an attempt to rectify the situation. This surge of NZAOC personnel was a success with further audits disclosing few if any deficiencies. To rectify the situation and prevent a re-occurrence, an amendment to Army regulations was published on 3 October 1918 to make the management of Quartermaster Sergeants a NZAOC responsibility.

The financial constraints of the interwar years saw that the management of Quartermaster Sergeants as an NZAOC responsibility never followed through in its entirety and the Supply system of the New Zealand Army evolved into two systems, one under the control of the New Zealand Army Ordnance Corps providing 2nd to 4th line (Wholesale) support with Unit Quartermaster Stores providing 1st Line (retail) support.

As a consequence of the 1993 re-balancing of the New Zealand Army, the RNZAOC Supplier trade and the All Arms Store-man trade we merged into one trade known as the Supply-Quartermaster Trade. The Supply-Quartermaster Trade was the re-branded as the Supply Technician Trade in October 2007.

Trade description 
Supply Technicians are tasked with ensuring that all of the supplies and services necessary for New Zealand Army operations are available at the right place at the right time. The Supply Technician Trade is a multidisciplinary trade providing integral and close support to Army and Joint Force units with a variety of items such as food, fuel, vehicles, spare parts, stationery, clothing and field services.

The principle responsibilities of New Zealand Army Supply Technicians are:

 General Supply
 Supply of Fuel Oil and Lubricants
 Field services, including
Field Shower
 laundry
 Tyre Repair
 Mortuary Affairs

New Zealand Army Supply Technicians can be found serving in all units of the New Zealand Army and Joint Forces in diverse international locations,  including combat zones at forward operating bases in diverse locations such as East Timor, Iraq or Afghanistan.

Training 
New Zealand Army Supply Technicians are primarily trained at the Supply Wing of Trade Training School at Trentham Camp.
The Supply Wing conducts core and non core Supply Trade courses.

Core Courses 

 Supply Technician RNZALR Junior Course
 Supply Technician RNZALR Intermediate Course
 Supply Technician RNZALR Senior Course
 Supply Technician RNZALR Supply Managers Course

Non Core Courses 

 Supply Technician Ration Management Course
 Supply Technician Petroleum Operators Course
 Supply Technician Petroleum Managers Course
 Accounting Officers All Corps Course
 Tyre Repair Course
 Mortuary Operations Course

Trade Badge 
During 2009 a distinct Supply Technician badge was approved for wear by any Non-Commissioned Officer, Warrant Officer or Officer who had qualified on the Supply Technician Supply Management Course. The badge consist of a Taiaha and Brass key diagonally crossed, with the four stars of the Southern Cross between each point.

Comparative trades in other New Zealand Armed Services 
The Royal New Zealand Navy (RNZN) and Royal New Zealand Air Force(RNZAF) Equivalent roles are;

 RNZN – Logistic Supply Specialist
 RNZAF – Logistic Specialist

Comparative trades in other Armed Forces 
The NZ Army Supply Technician trade is similar to the following trades in other Armed Forces;

Royal Logistic Corps 
Logistic Supply Specialist
Petroleum Operator
Royal Australian Army Ordnance Corps 
Supply Coordinator
Petroleum Technician
Royal Canadian Logistics Service 
Materiel Management Technician
United States Army Quartermaster Corps 
MOS 92A Automated Logistical Specialist
MOS 92F Petroleum & Supply Specialist 
MOS 92L Petroleum Laboratory Specialist 
MOS 92M Mortuary Affairs Specialist 
MOS 92S Shower/Laundry and Clothing Repair Specialist 
MOS 92Y Unit Supply Specialist
MOS 92Z Senior Non-commissioned Logistician
United States Marine Corps
MOS 1390 Bulk Fuel Officer,
MOS 1391 Bulk Fuel Specialist, 
MOS 3534 Semitrailer Refueler Operator
MOS 3000 Basic Supply Administration and Operations Marine
MOS 3043 Supply Chain and Materiel Management Specialist 
MOS 3044 Contract Specialist
MOS 3051 Warehouse Clerk 
MOS 3052 Packaging Specialist

Notes

Further reading 

 Bolton, J. S., A history of The Royal New Zealand Army Ordnance Corps (Trentham: The Corps, 1992)
 K idson, A. L, Petrol Company [Series title: Official History of New Zealand in the Second World War 1939–45], Published by War History Branch, Department of Internal Affairs, Wellington (1961)
 Bates, P. W, Supply Company [Series Title: Official History of New Zealand in the Second World War 1939–45], Published by War History Branch, Department of Internal Affairs, Wellington, New Zealand (1955)

External links 

 'To the Warrior his Arms – a history of the RNZAOC and its predecessors

Military specialisms
Quartermasters